The Western Army of the Ottoman Empire (Turkish: Garp Ordusu) was one of the field armies of the Ottoman Army. It was formed during the mobilization phase of the First Balkan War. It confronted Serbian, Greek, Montenegrin and Bulgarian armies. It numbered app. 154,000 troops and 372 artillery.

Order of Battle, 19 October 1912 
On 19 October 1912, the army was structured as follows:

Serbian Front:
 Vardar Army (app. 65,000 men and 172 artillery) on Serbian approach. Commander was Gen. Zeki Pasha
Bulgarian Front:
 Ustruma Corps
Montenegrin Front:
 Provisional İşkodra Corps
 İpek Detachment
Greek Front:
 VIII Provisional Corps
 Yanya Corps
 Karaburun Detachment
 Salonika Reserve Division

Sources 

Field armies of the Ottoman Empire
Military units and formations of the Ottoman Empire in the Balkan Wars